The List of mire landscapes in Switzerland is a list of Swiss bogs and wetlands. It is from the Federal Inventory of Mire Landscapes of Particular Beauty and National Importance in Switzerland.

Mire landscapes

References

See also 
 Nature parks in Switzerland

External links
Switzerland - Mire Landscapes of National Importance (CH07), Common Database on Designated Areas (CDDA)
Map: Moorlandschaften 

Wetlands of Switzerland
Mires
Mires
Mires
Bogs of Switzerland